Kingsthorpe is a rural town and locality in the Toowoomba Region, Queensland, Australia.

Geography

Kingsthorpe railway station on the Western railway line serves the town. Kings railway station is a closed station on that line on the boundary between the localities of Kingsthorpe and Kings Siding.

History
The town was named after pastoralist brothers Colonel Henry Venn King and George Beresford King, of the Gowrie pastoral property.

St Gregory's Anglican Church in Meringandan was consecrated on Sunday 12 September 1886 by Bishop William Webber. It was located on a  piece of land near the railway station, donated by Mr Foland. In 1905 it was relocated to Kingsthorpe where it was re-consecrated at St Gregory's by Archbishop St Clair Donaldson on 20 October 1905. The church was closed circa 1982.

Kingsthorpe State School opened on 10 July 1911.

Kingsthorpe was in the Shire of Rosalie until 2008, when the shire was amalgamated into the new Toowoomba Region local government area.

Education 
Kingsthorpe State School is a government primary (Prep-6) school for boys and girls at Goombungee Road. In 2017, the school had an enrolment of 187 students with 13 teachers (12 full-time equivalent) and 12 non-teaching staff (7 full-time equivalent).

There is no secondary school in Kingsthorpe. The nearest secondary schools are in Oakey, Highfields, and Wilsonton Heights (in Toowoomba).

Amenities
Library services in Kingsthorpe are provided by the Toowoomba Regional Council's mobile library service. The van visits Kingsthorpe State School  and Kingsthorpe Village Green every Wednesday.

Kingsthorpe features a number of parks with recreation areas, play equipment, and amenities, including Rosalie Walk, Settlers Park, Village Green, and Stoney Ridge Park. The Recreational Reserve has a large sporting oval, tennis courts, picnic facilities with an electric barbeque, and a clubhouse with a canteen and amenities.

The Kingsthorpe branch of the Queensland Country Women's Association meets at 2 Gowrie Street (beside the Kingsthorpe and District Memorial Hall).

Attractions 
Mount Kingsthorpe Bushland Reserve is on a hill in the south-east of the locality. Access is between 29 and 33 Emmanulla Road.

References

External links

 
 

Towns in Queensland
Towns in the Darling Downs
Toowoomba Region
Shire of Rosalie
Localities in Queensland